Harringay Station may refer one of two railway stations in Harringay, North London:

 Harringay railway station - a north–south station off Wightman Road 
 Harringay Green Lanes railway station - an east–west station on Green Lanes